Yoann Deslot (born 15 May 1984 in La Tronche) is a French former competitive figure skater. He placed 12th in his senior Grand Prix debut at the 2008 Trophée Eric Bompard.

Programs

Competitive highlights
GP: Grand Prix; JGP: Junior Grand Prix

References

External links
 
 Official site 
 Tracings.net profile

1984 births
Living people
Sportspeople from La Tronche
French male single skaters
Figure skaters at the 2007 Winter Universiade
Competitors at the 2009 Winter Universiade